Erotic asphyxiation (variously called asphyxiophilia, hypoxyphilia or breath control play) is the intentional restriction of oxygen to the brain for the purposes of sexual arousal. The term autoerotic asphyxiation is used when the act is done by a person to themselves. Colloquially, a person engaging in the activity is sometimes called a gasper. Erotic asphyxiation can lead to accidental death due to asphyxia.

The erotic interest in asphyxiation is classified as a paraphilia in the Diagnostic and Statistical Manual of the American Psychiatric Association.

Physiology

Concerning hallucinogenic states brought about by chronic hypoxia, Dr. E. L. Lloyd notes that they may be similar to the hallucinations experienced by climbers at altitude. He further notes that no such state occurs in hypoxia brought about by sudden aircraft decompression at altitude. These findings suggest to him that they do not arrive purely from a lack of oxygen. Upon examining the studies on hypoxia he found that "abnormalities in the cerebral neurochemistry involving one or more of the interconnected neurotransmitters, dopamine, serotonin, and beta-endorphin had been reported in all the conditions associated with hallucinations."

History 

Historically, the practice of autoerotic asphyxiation has been documented since the early 17th century. It was first used as a treatment for erectile dysfunction. The idea for this most likely came from subjects who were executed by hanging. Observers at public hangings noted that male victims developed an erection, sometimes remaining after death (a death erection), and occasionally ejaculated when being hanged.

Practice
Various methods are used to achieve the level of oxygen depletion needed, such as a hanging, suffocation with a plastic bag over the head, self-strangulation such as with a ligature, gas or volatile solvents, chest compression, or some combination of these. Complicated devices (such as hydraulics) are sometimes used to produce the desired effects. The practice can be dangerous even if performed with care and has resulted in a significant number of accidental deaths. Uva (1995) writes "Estimates of the mortality rate of autoerotic asphyxia range from 250 to 1000 deaths per year in the United States." Cases have also been reported in Scandinavia and Germany. Swedish police reported in 1994 that the number of autoerotic asphyxiation fatalities in the Stockholm area (c. 1.7 million inhabitants) were at least five annually, but the number of unrecorded cases was assumed to be high. Autoerotic asphyxiation may often be mistaken for suicide, which is a major cause of death in teenagers.

Accidental death 

Deaths often occur when the loss of consciousness caused by partial asphyxia leads to loss of control over the means of strangulation, resulting in continued asphyxia and death. While often asphyxiophilia is incorporated into sex with a partner, others enjoy this behaviour by themselves, making it potentially more difficult to get out of dangerous situations.

In some fatality cases, the body of the asphyxiophilic individual is discovered naked or with genitalia in hand, with pornographic material or sex toys present, or with evidence of having orgasmed prior to death. Bodies found at the scene of an accidental death often show evidence of other paraphilic activities, such as fetishistic cross-dressing and masochism. In cases involving teenagers at home, families may disturb the scene by "sanitizing" it, removing evidence of paraphilic activity. This can have the consequence of making the death appear to be a deliberate suicide, rather than an accident.

The great majority of known erotic asphyxial deaths are male; among all known cases in Ontario and Alberta from 1974 to 1987, only 1 out of 117 cases was female. Some individual cases of women with erotic asphyxia have been reported. The main age of accidental death is mid-20s, but deaths have been reported in adolescents and in men in their 70s.

Lawyers and insurance companies have brought cases to the attention of clinicians because some life insurance claims are payable in the event of accidental death, but not suicide.

In fiction 

The sensational nature of erotic asphyxiation often makes it the subject of urban legends.  It has also been mentioned specifically in a number of works of fiction.
 In the Marquis de Sade's famous novel Justine, or The Misfortunes of the Virtue, Justine is subjected to this by one of her captors.  She survives the encounter.
 In the Guts short story in Chuck Palahniuk's novel Haunted, one the characters discusses parents who discover the accidental deaths of their sons to autoerotic asphyxiation.  They are said to cover up the deaths before police or coroners arrive to save the family from shame.
 In the novel (and later movie adaptation) Rising Sun, death as a result of this type of sexual arousal is explained when it is offered as a possible cause for a murder victim's death.
 In the film World's Greatest Dad, the protagonist's teenage son accidentally kills himself with asphyxiation whilst sexually aroused. The protagonist then stages his son's death as a suicide, which gives him the opportunity to rise to infamy through a literary hoax.
 In the film Ken Park a character named Tate practices autoerotic asphyxia.
 Autoerotic asphyxiation occurs in the cold open of Six Feet Under episode Back to the Garden. 
 Kenny from South Park dies from suffocating while wearing a Batman costume and practicing autoerotic asphyxia in the episode "Sexual Healing". 
 In the season four episode of Californication, titled "Monkey Business", the character Zig Semetauer is found dead in his bathroom by Hank, Charlie and Stu after suffocating due to autoerotic asphyxia, to which Hank quips "I'm not averse to the occasional choke-n'-stroke, but this is a prime example of why one must always use a buddy system."
 A character in the film Knocked Up offers to be a "spotter" for a friend if he intends on performing autoerotic asphyxiation.
 Bruce Robertson, the main character in the 1998 Irvine Welsh novel, Filth, engages in the practice.  This is also depicted in the 2013 film adaptation.
In the sixth episode, season two of BoJack Horseman, autoerotic asphyxiation and celebrity deaths are recurrent discussions.
In the episode, "Clyde Bruckman's Final Repose" of the TV series The X-Files, a psychic implies that special agent Fox Mulder will die by autoerotic asphyxiation.

See also
 Cerebral hypoxia
 Choke hold
 Choking game
 Facesitting
 Hypoxia
 Self-bondage
 Sexual fetishism

References

Further reading
 Robert R. Hazelwood, Park Elliot Dietz, Ann Wolbert Burgess: Autoerotic Fatalities. Lexington, Mass.: LexingtonBooks, 1983.
 Sergey Sheleg, Edwin Ehrlich: Autoerotic Asphyxiation: Forensic, Medical, and Social Aspects, Wheatmark (15 August 2006), trade paperback, 208 pages  
 John Money, Gordon Wainwright and David Hingsburger: The Breathless Orgasm: A Lovemap Biography of Asphyxiophilia. Buffalo, New York: Prometheus Books, 1991.

External links

 Well Hung: Death By Orgasm
 Turvey B. "An Objective Overview of Autoerotic Fatalities"
 The Medical Realities of Breath Control Play By Jay Wiseman
 Is there a safe way to perform autoerotic asphyxiation? - Slate Magazine i

BDSM terminology
Paraphilias
Respiration